Grzegorz Polaczyk (born 2 July 1985 in Nowy Sącz) is a Polish slalom canoeist who competed at the international level from 2001 to 2014.

He won two medals in the K1 team event at the ICF Canoe Slalom World Championships with a silver in 2013 and a bronze in 2006. He also won two golds, two silvers and a bronze in the same event at the European Championships.

Polacyzk finished seventh in the K1 event at the 2004 Summer Olympics in Athens.

He has four brothers (Mateusz, Rafał, Henryk and Łukasz) and two sisters (Joanna Mędoń and Iwona) all of whom have competed in canoe slalom.

References

Yahoo! Sports 2004 Summer Olympics profile

1985 births
Canoeists at the 2004 Summer Olympics
Living people
Olympic canoeists of Poland
Polish male canoeists
Sportspeople from Nowy Sącz
Medalists at the ICF Canoe Slalom World Championships